Urban Žibert (born 8 May 1992) is a Slovenian professional footballer who plays as a midfielder.

Club career
On 19 July 2016 he became a new Juve Stabia player.

On 18 January 2017, Žibert was signed by Bassano on loan.

On 31 August 2017 he went to Monopoli on loan.

He returned to Reggina on loan for the 2018–19 season on 31 August 2018.

On 31 January 2019, Reggina acquired his rights on a permanent basis.

On 2 September 2019 he was loaned to Bisceglie.

On 27 August 2020 he became a new Mantova player.

On 31 January 2022, Žibert moved to Vibonese.

References

External links
PrvaLiga profile 
 
 

1992 births
Living people
Footballers from Ljubljana
Slovenian footballers
Association football midfielders
Slovenian PrvaLiga players
FC Koper players
Serie C players
Reggina 1914 players
S.S. Akragas Città dei Templi players
S.S. Juve Stabia players
Bassano Virtus 55 S.T. players
S.S. Monopoli 1966 players
A.S. Bisceglie Calcio 1913 players
Mantova 1911 players
U.S. Vibonese Calcio players
Slovenian expatriate footballers
Slovenian expatriate sportspeople in Italy
Expatriate footballers in Italy
Slovenia youth international footballers
Slovenia under-21 international footballers